The Pine Hill Schools are a comprehensive community public school district that serves students in pre-kindergarten through twelfth grade from Pine Hill, in Camden County, New Jersey, United States.

As of the 2018–19 school year, the district, comprising four schools, had an enrollment of 1,899 students and 168.6 classroom teachers (on an FTE basis), for a student–teacher ratio of 11.3:1.

The district is classified by the New Jersey Department of Education as being in District Factor Group "B", the second lowest of eight groupings. District Factor Groups organize districts statewide to allow comparison by common socioeconomic characteristics of the local districts. From lowest socioeconomic status to highest, the categories are A, B, CD, DE, FG, GH, I and J.

Following the dissolution of the Lower Camden County Regional School District, Overbrook High School became part of the Pine Hill district as of September 2001, with students from Berlin Township and Clementon attending the school as part of sending/receiving relationships.

Schools
Schools in the district (with 2018–19 enrollment data from the National Center for Education Statistics) are:

Elementary schools
Dr. Albert Bean Elementary School with 370 students in grades PreK-5
Dan Schuster, Principal
John H. Glenn Elementary School with 453 students in grades PreK-5
James Vacca, Principal
Middle school
Pine Hill Middle School with 377 students in grades 6-8
Kathleen Klemick, Principal
High school
Overbrook High School with 656 students in grades 9-12
Adam Lee, Principal

Administration
Core members of the district's administration are:
Dr. Kenneth Koczur, Superintendent
Deborah Piccirillo, Business Administrator / Board Secretary

Board of education
The district's board of education, with nine members, sets policy and oversees the fiscal and educational operation of the district through its administration. As a Type II school district, the board's trustees are elected directly by voters to serve three-year terms of office on a staggered basis, with three seats up for election each year held (since 2012) as part of the November general election. Berlin Township and Clementon are represented on the board by members appointed by the sending district.

References

External links
Pine Hill Schools
 
School Data for the Pine Hill Schools, National Center for Education Statistics

Pine Hill, New Jersey
New Jersey District Factor Group B
School districts in Camden County, New Jersey